Paranemertes is a genus of worms belonging to the family Neesiidae.

The species of this genus are found in Northern Pacific Ocean.

Species:

Paranemertes brattstroemi 
Paranemertes californica 
Paranemertes carnea 
Paranemertes cornea
Paranemertes incola 
Paranemertes katoi 
Paranemertes neesii 
Paranemertes pallida 
Paranemertes peregrina 
Paranemertes plana 
Paranemertes sanjuanensis

References

Nemerteans